Photosho was a Canadian magazine that exhibits the photography of Canadian photographers and explores their world. The magazine is published biannually, in September and in April. Each issue contains a theme, and all Canadian photographers are offered a chance to submit an image for consideration in their printed exhibit. Also contained in each issue are several "shocased" artists from across Canada, as well as articles on the culture of Canadian photographers. The magazine is headquartered in Ottawa.

References

External links
Photosho magazine

Biannual magazines published in Canada
Visual arts magazines published in Canada
Magazines established in 2007
Magazines published in Ottawa
Photography magazines